Veščica or Veščica pri Murski Soboti is a village in the Municipality of Murska Sobota in the Prekmurje region of Slovenia.

Name
The name of the settlement was changed from Veščica to Veščica pri Murski Soboti in 1955.

References

External links
Veščica on Geopedia

Populated places in the City Municipality of Murska Sobota